Compsolechia is a genus of moths in the family Gelechiidae.

Species
 Compsolechia abolitella (Walker, 1864)
 Compsolechia abruptella (Walker, 1864)
 Compsolechia accinctella (Walker, 1864)
 Compsolechia acosmeta (Walsingham, 1910)
 Compsolechia aequilibris Meyrick, 1931
 Compsolechia amaurota (Meyrick, 1914)
 Compsolechia amazonica Meyrick, 1918
 Compsolechia ambusta (Walsingham, 1910)
 Compsolechia anthracura (Meyrick, 1914)
 Compsolechia antiplaca Meyrick, 1922
 Compsolechia argyracma Meyrick, 1922
 Compsolechia atmastra Meyrick, 1929
 Compsolechia balia (Walsingham, 1910)
 Compsolechia binotatella (Walker, 1864)
 Compsolechia blepharopa (Meyrick, 1914)
 Compsolechia camilotus Adamski, 2009
 Compsolechia campalea (Walsingham, 1910)
 Compsolechia canofusella (Walker, 1864)
 Compsolechia caryoterma Meyrick, 1922
 Compsolechia cassidata (Meyrick, 1914)
 Compsolechia chelidonia Meyrick, 1922
 Compsolechia chrysoplaca (Meyrick, 1912)
 Compsolechia cognatella (Walker, 1864)
 Compsolechia corymbas Meyrick, 1918
 Compsolechia crescentifasciella (Chambers, 1874)
 Compsolechia crocodilopa Meyrick, 1922
 Compsolechia desectella (Zeller, 1877)
 Compsolechia diazeucta Meyrick, 1918
 Compsolechia dicax (Meyrick, 1914)
 Compsolechia diplolychna Meyrick, 1922
 Compsolechia drachmaea Meyrick, 1922
 Compsolechia dryocrossa Meyrick, 1922
 Compsolechia elephas (Walsingham, 1910)
 Compsolechia epibola (Walsingham, 1910)
 Compsolechia erebodelta Meyrick, 1922
 Compsolechia eupecta (Meyrick, 1914)
 Compsolechia eurygypsa Meyrick, 1922
 Compsolechia fasciella (Felder & Rogenhofer, 1875)
 Compsolechia ferreata (Meyrick, 1914)
 Compsolechia glaphyra (Walsingham, 1910)
 Compsolechia halmyra (Meyrick, 1914)
 Compsolechia hemileucas Meyrick, 1922
 Compsolechia incurva (Meyrick, 1914)
 Compsolechia inusta (Meyrick, 1914)
 Compsolechia ischnoptera Meyrick, 1922
 Compsolechia leucorrhapta (Meyrick, 1914)
 Compsolechia lingulata Meyrick, 1918
 Compsolechia lithomorpha (Meyrick, 1914)
 Compsolechia loxogramma Meyrick, 1922
 Compsolechia mangelivora (Walsingham, 1897)
 Compsolechia melanophaea (Forbes, 1931)
 Compsolechia mesodelta Meyrick, 1922
 Compsolechia metadupa (Walsingham, 1910)
 Compsolechia mniocosma Meyrick, 1922
 Compsolechia molybdina (Walsingham, 1910)
 Compsolechia monochromella (Walker, 1864)
 Compsolechia neurophora Meyrick, 1922
 Compsolechia niobella (Felder & Rogenhofer, 1875)
 Compsolechia niphocentra Meyrick, 1922
 Compsolechia nuptella (Felder & Rogenhofer, 1875)
 Compsolechia ocelligera (Butler, 1883)
 Compsolechia orthophracta (Meyrick, 1914)
 Compsolechia parmata Meyrick, 1918
 Compsolechia peculella (Busck, 1914)
 Compsolechia pentastra Meyrick, 1922
 Compsolechia percnospila (Meyrick, 1914)
 Compsolechia perlatella (Walker, 1864)
 Compsolechia petromorpha Meyrick, 1922
 Compsolechia phaeotoxa Meyrick, 1922
 Compsolechia phepsalitis Meyrick, 1922
 Compsolechia picticornis (Walsingham, 1897)
 Compsolechia platiastis Meyrick, 1922
 Compsolechia plumbeolata (Walsingham, 1897)
 Compsolechia praenivea (Meyrick, 1914)
 Compsolechia ptochogramma Meyrick, 1922
 Compsolechia pungens Meyrick, 1922
 Compsolechia quadrifascia (Walker, 1864)
 Compsolechia recta Meyrick, 1922
 Compsolechia repandella (Walker, 1864)
 Compsolechia refracta (Meyrick, 1914)
 Compsolechia religata Meyrick, 1922
 Compsolechia rhombica Meyrick, 1922
 Compsolechia salebrosa Meyrick, 1918
 Compsolechia sciomima Meyrick, 1922
 Compsolechia scitella (Walker, 1864)
 Compsolechia scopulata (Meyrick, 1914)
 Compsolechia scutella (Zeller, 1877)
 Compsolechia secretella (Walker, 1864)
 Compsolechia seductella (Walker, 1864)
 Compsolechia sesamodes Meyrick, 1922
 Compsolechia siderophaea (Walsingham, 1910)
 Compsolechia solidella Walker, 1864
 Compsolechia sporozona (Meyrick, 1914)
 Compsolechia stasigastra Meyrick, 1922
 Compsolechia stelliferella (Walker, 1864)
 Compsolechia stillata Meyrick, 1922
 Compsolechia subapicalis (Walker, 1864)
 Compsolechia succincta (Walsingham, 1910)
 Compsolechia suffectella (Walker, 1864)
 Compsolechia superfusella (Walker, 1864)
 Compsolechia suspectella Walker, 1864
 Compsolechia tardella (Walker, 1864)
 Compsolechia terrenella (Busck, 1914)
 Compsolechia tetrortha Meyrick, 1922
 Compsolechia thysanora (Meyrick, 1914)
 Compsolechia titanota (Walsingham, 1910)
 Compsolechia trachycnemis Meyrick, 1922
 Compsolechia transjectella (Walker, 1864)
 Compsolechia trapezias Meyrick, 1922
 Compsolechia trochilea (Walsingham, 1910)
 Compsolechia versatella (Walker, 1864)
 Compsolechia vittatiella Adamski, 2009
 Compsolechia volubilis Meyrick, 1922
 Compsolechia zebrina (Walsingham, 1910)

Status unclear
 Compsolechia apatelia (Durrant), described as Anacampsis apatelia [unavailable name]
 Compsolechia mutabilis (Walsingham), described as Anacampsis mutabilis [unavailable name]

References

 Adamski & Boege, 2009. TWO NEW SPECIES OF COMPSOLECHIA MEYRICK (LEPIDOPTERA: GELECHIIDAE) ASSOCIATED WITH CASEARIA (FLACOURTIACEAE) IN COASTAL DRY-FORESTS OF WESTERN MEXICO

 
Anacampsini